Vinod Kumari Chandel is an Indian politician and member of the Bharatiya Janata Party. Vinod Kumari was a member of the Himachal Pradesh Legislative Assembly from the Doon constituency in Solan district.

References 

People from Solan district
Bharatiya Janata Party politicians from Himachal Pradesh
Himachal Pradesh MLAs 2007–2012
Living people
21st-century Indian politicians
Year of birth missing (living people)